NGC 7042 is a spiral galaxy located about 210 million light-years away in the constellation of Pegasus. NGC 7042 is part of a pair of galaxies that contains the galaxy NGC 7043. Astronomer William Herschel discovered NGC 7042 on October 16, 1784.

On October 23, 2013, a Type Ia supernova designated as SN 2013fw was discovered in NGC 7042.

References

External links 

Spiral galaxies
Pegasus (constellation)
7042
11702
66378
Astronomical objects discovered in 1784